Charbagh Kangri is a mountain peak located at 6,698m (21 975ft) above sea level in the easternmost subrange of the Karakoram range in India.

Location
The peak is located near the vicinity of Line of Actual Control which exists between Aksai Chin (China) and the Union territory of Ladakh (India). The prominence is 1,349m/4,426 ft. It can be reached from Rongdu village, Diskit-Nubra Valley.

References 

Mountains of the Transhimalayas
Six-thousanders of the Transhimalayas
Mountains of Ladakh